Kemptville Creek is a stream in the municipalities of North Grenville and Augusta, in the United Counties of Leeds and Grenville, in Eastern Ontario, Canada. It is in the Ottawa River drainage basin, is a right tributary of the Rideau River, and is under the auspices of the Rideau Valley Conservation Authority.

Portions of the drainage basin extend into other municipalities of Leeds and Grenville, such as Athens, Elizabethtown-Kitley and Merrickville–Wolford. The creek was historically referred to by the name South Branch of the Rideau River, until its name was changed to Kemptville Creek in 1908. However, the former name is still in use .

Course
The main branch, also called the South Branch, beings northwest of the community of North Augusta in the municipality of Augusta, where it immediately takes in the right tributary Mud Creek. It travels north, passing into North Grenville near the community of Bishop's Mills.

The North Branch begins at Cranberry Lake in Merrickville–Wolford, and flows northeast, passes into North Grenville as it flows through the community of Bishop's Mills, before joining the main branch northeast of the community.

Combined, the creek continues north through the community of Oxford Mills, where it goes over Oxford Mills Dam, flows under the Canadian Pacific Railway main line, heads through Kemptville, where it takes in the right tributary Barnes Creek, and reaches its mouth at the Rideau River. The Rideau River flows northward to the Ottawa River.

Recreation
The creek is navigable, for smaller watercraft, from the Rideau River to the town docks in Kemptville. In the spring, it should be possible to canoe from Oxford Station Road (or further) to the Rideau River with one portage.

Tributaries
Barnes Creek (right)
North Branch Kemptville Creek (left)
Muldoons Creek
Mud Creek (right)

References

Sources

External links
 Kemptville Creek Subwatershed Report 2013 from the Rideau Valley Conservation Authority
 Photos from Mudpuppy night on the Kemptville Creek
 The Kemptville Creek anthem

Rivers of Leeds and Grenville United Counties